Dominique Ross (born January 12, 1972) is a former American football running back in the National Football League for the Dallas Cowboys. He also was a member of the Jacksonville Tomcats in the Arena Football League 2. He played college football at Valdosta State University.

Early years
Ross attended William M. Raines High School, where he played running back and became one of the top recruits in the state of Florida.

In 1989, he accepted a football scholarship from Florida State University. He didn't play in his first year because of failing to meet the requirements of Proposition 48 and left the school in 1990.

In 1992, he transferred to Division II Valdosta State University where he was coached by Hal Mumme and was named the starting fullback. As a sophomore, he played in only 9 games, leading the team with 153 carries for 734 yards and 10 touchdowns.

As a junior, he became the first player in school history to rush for over 1,000 yards, registering 167 carries for 1,030 yards (6.2-yard avg.) and 13 touchdowns, while also collecting 64 receptions for 492 yards and 3 touchdowns. Against Fort Valley State University, he had 30 carries for 218 yards and 3 touchdowns.

As a senior, he broke his record by tallying 256 carries for 1,473 rushing yards (5.8-yard avg.) and 13 touchdowns. Against Livingston University, he had 11 carries for 249 rushing yards (22.6-yard avg.), including a 93-yard touchdown run.

Ross finished his college career with school records for career rushing yards (3,237), career touchdowns (36), single-season rushing yards (1,473 yards), single-season rushing attempts (256) and longest run (93 yards).

In 2016, he was inducted into the Valdosta State Athletic Hall of Fame. He was also named to the Valdosta State team of the decade in the 1990s.

Professional career

Dallas Cowboys
Ross was signed as an undrafted free agent by the Dallas Cowboys after the 1995 NFL Draft on April 25. He was waived on August 22 and signed to the practice squad. On December 21, he was promoted to the active roster for the season finale against the Arizona Cardinals, making 2 special teams tackles. He was a part of the Super Bowl XXX winning team. He was released on August 25, 1996 and was later re-signed.

Tampa Bay Buccaneers
On March 11, 1997, he was signed as a free agent by the Tampa Bay Buccaneers. He was released to make room for rookie running back Warrick Dunn on July 25, after he ended his contract holdout.

Mobile Admirals
In 1999, Ross played for the Mobile Admirals of the short-lived Regional Football League, where he was teammates with fellow former-Cowboys running back Sherman Williams.

Jacksonville Tomcats (AF2)
In 2002,  he signed with the Jacksonville Tomcats of the Arena Football League 2. He played there until the team folded in 2003.

References

1972 births
Living people
William M. Raines High School alumni
Players of American football from Jacksonville, Florida
Valdosta State Blazers football players
Dallas Cowboys players
Regional Football League players
Jacksonville Tomcats players